Tel Aviv Air was a short-lived German virtual airline headquartered in Hamburg.

History 
Tel Aviv Air was founded by travel agency owner Shlomo Almagor and Paul Scodellaro, former sales manager of Germania, which went bankrupt in 2019 with the goal to reestablish direct flights between Hamburg and Tel Aviv. In April 2021, Tel Aviv Air was entered into the commercial register in Hamburg. 

Tel Aviv Air's inaugural flight was scheduled for 19 September 2021, but was postponed twice due to the COVID-19 pandemic. The first flight finally took place on 6 March 2022. The flights are operated by the Cypriot Tus Airways, with an Airbus A320. Between 6 March 2022 and 24 March 2022 the flights were operated by the Polish charter airline Enter Air with Boeing 737-800.

However in May 2022, after only a few weeks of operations, Tel Aviv Air ceased flights and filed for bankruptcy.

Destinations
As of May 2022, Tel Aviv Air served the following destinations:

Fleet
As of May 2022, the Tel Aviv Air fleet consisted of the following contracted aircraft:

References

External links
Official website

Defunct airlines of Germany
Airlines established in 2021
Airlines disestablished in 2022
2021 establishments in Germany
2022 disestablishments in Germany